Placide Nyangala (born 30 December 1967) is a Gabonese footballer. Besides Gabon, he has played in France, Austria, and Saudi Arabia. He played in two matches for the Gabon national football team in 1994. He was also named in Gabon's squad for the 1994 African Cup of Nations tournament.

References

External links
 

1967 births
Living people
Gabonese footballers
FC 105 Libreville players
AS Nancy Lorraine players
SAS Épinal players
US Orléans players
FC Aurillac Arpajon Cantal Auvergne players
SV Stockerau players
FC Lorient players
Ligue 2 players
Gabon international footballers
1994 African Cup of Nations players
Place of birth missing (living people)
Association football midfielders
Gabonese expatriate footballers
Expatriate footballers in France
Gabonese expatriate sportspeople in France
Gabonese expatriate sportspeople in Austria
Expatriate footballers in Austria